The 1986–87 season was Sport Lisboa e Benfica's 83rd season in existence and the club's 53rd consecutive season in the top flight of Portuguese football, covering the period from 1 July 1986 to 30 June 1987. Benfica competed domestically in the Primeira Divisão, Taça de Portugal and the Supertaça Cândido de Oliveira, and participated in the  Cup Winners' Cup after winning the Taça de Portugal in the previous season.

Following a close-call title race in the past season, Benfica sought to win the title that escaped since 1984. Only small adjustments were made to the squad, a new forward, Chiquinho Carlos, and two new centre-backs, Dito and Edmundo, countered the loss of Nené. Despite a slow start, by early November, Benfica was leading the league by two points after six consecutive wins. A shocking 7–1 defeat to Sporting saw Porto match them in first place, but the team reacted with a 3–1 win against their challengers, bringing back first place isolated. A draw and five wins in a row followed, with Benfica finally securing the title on 24 May, after three consecutive draws that threatened the lead. The season closed with another Taça de Portugal win, the third in a row and the sixth in eight years, therefore completing the double, a feat the club would have to wait nearly 30 years to repeat.

Season summary
Benfica entered the new season trying to recover from the dramatic season finale of the past league, when John Mortimore squandered a two-point lead in the last two match-days, costing Benfica the title. Mortimore remained in charge, but very few changes were made to his roster. A new forward, Chiquinho Carlos, plus two new centre-backs, Dito and Edmundo. On the other end, Nené retired and Michael Manniche nearly left, but was persuaded to do another season. The pre-season began on 9 July with medicals, and the first game was on the 26 with Portimonense, followed by the presentation game of Vitória de Setúbal on 1 August. Afterwards Benfica played two games with Southampton, one in Lisbon and one in England, and competed in the Lisbon International Tournament, winning it. Due to the events occurred in the 1986 Taça de Portugal Final, the Portuguese Football Federation punished Benfica with a one-game interdiction of Estádio da Luz. The club selected Estádio Nacional as the alternative for the home reception in match-day two.

Benfica's league campaign started with a Clássico with Porto, which ended with a draw. A win in match-day 2 was followed by another draw. Six consecutive wins propelled Benfica into first place isolated, with two points in hand. In the end of November, Benfica contested the Supertaça with Porto and was defeated by 4–2 at home, after a one-all draw in Antas. On the second week of December, in the Derby de Lisboa with Sporting, Benfica conceded their largest loss ever in the Primeira Divisão, losing 7–1. Fans reacted with anger towards Mortimore and ripped flags and scarfs with the club image. President Fernando Martins responded with "This was an accident that will not happen in 100 years. I believe that this people that insulted Mortimore will think of him as great in the future". Nonetheless, Benfica closed the year tied in first place with Porto, receiving them in their next home match, on 4 January 1987. With the largest crowd ever in Estádio da Luz, 135 000, saw Rui Águas score a hat-trick  for a 3–1 win for Benfica.

Another draw in the following match-day, with Varzim hindered the team progress, but five consecutive wins until day 22 opened a four-point lead to Porto. Benfica managed the difference in the remainder of the campaign, despite three consecutive draws from match-day 26 to 28 that shortened that lead. On 24 May, 125 000 fans witnessed Benfica beat Sporting by a 2–1 and secure their 27th league title. Players chanted: "We do not have the best team, we do not have the best roster, but we won the championship", a clear jab at the team critics. Benfica was not the best attack, or the best defence, but had only lost once and Mortimore was credited for taking everything out an ageing squad in need of renewal.

Earlier in the month, Benfica had progressed to the Final of the Taça de Portugal, which they conquered against Sporting, again by 2–1 on 7 June. It was their third consecutive Taça de Portugal win, and the sixth since 1979–80. Despite completing a double, Mortimore departed the club, saying: "I will not stay in a club where are people that do not want me here", allegedly towards new President, João Santos. Benfica had to wait 27 years to win another double, with the streak ending in 2013–14.

Competitions

Overall record

Supertaça Cândido de Oliveira

Primeira Divisão

League table

Results by round

Matches

Taça de Portugal

European Cup Winners' Cup

First round

Second round

Friendlies

Player statistics
The squad for the season consisted of the players listed in the tables below, as well as staff member John Mortimore (manager),  Toni (assistant manager).

|}

Transfers

In

Out

Out by loan

Notes

References

Bibliography
 
 
 
 

S.L. Benfica seasons
Benfica
Portuguese football championship-winning seasons